Qais is an Arabic given name. 'Qays' and 'Qai' are alternatives of Qais.

Notable people with the name include:
Imru' al-Qais, Arabic poet in the 6th century
Kais Saied (born 1958), Tunisian President
Qais Ashfaq (born 1993), British boxer
Qais Abdur Rashid, legendary founding father of the Pashtuns
Qais Khazali (born 1974), founder of the Iran-backed Special Groups
Qais Essa (born 1975), Iraqi international football player
Qais Akbar Omar (born 1982), Afghan-American writer
Qais Al-Sindy (born 1967), Iraqi painter
Azzan bin Qais, Sultan of Oman

Arabic masculine given names